Upper Savonia is a subdivision of Northern Savonia and one of the Sub-regions of Finland since 2009.

Municipalities

 Iisalmi
 Keitele
 Kiuruvesi
 Lapinlahti
 Pielavesi
 Sonkajärvi
 Vieremä

Politics
Results of the 2018 Finnish presidential election:

 Sauli Niinistö   58.5%
 Paavo Väyrynen   10.4%
 Matti Vanhanen   9.8%
 Laura Huhtasaari   8.2%
 Pekka Haavisto   6.3%
 Merja Kyllönen   4.3%
 Tuula Haatainen   2.2%
 Nils Torvalds   0.3%

Sub-regions of Finland
Geography of North Savo